Panola is an unincorporated community in Crenshaw County, Alabama, United States, located  east of Fort Deposit.

References

Unincorporated communities in Crenshaw County, Alabama
Unincorporated communities in Alabama